Butin is a flavanone, a type of flavonoid. The compound can be found in the seeds of Vernonia anthelmintica (Asteraceae) and in the wood of Dalbergia odorifera (Fabaceae).

Glycosides
 Butin 7-O-β-D-glucopyranoside is found in Bidens tripartita (Asteraceae).

References
 

Flavanones
Catechols